The Crestone School, also known as the Crestone Community Building, at Cottonwood St. and Carbonate Ave. in Crestone, Colorado, was built in 1880 and was listed on the National Register of Historic Places in 1986.

It is a one-story two-classroom front-gabled building.

The school's bell is a contributing object in the listing.  It was cast by C.B. Bell Company of Hillsboro, Ohio in 1912.  It hung in a wooden tower which eventually deteriorated.  The bell was placed, in 1976, upon a pyramid of "Crestone Conglomerate Rock" as part of Crestone's Centennial Celebration.

A small/shed-roof woodshed at the north rear of the building and was built before 1935; it and two c. 1910 frame outhouses were deemed contributing buildings in the listing.

References

Schools in Colorado
National Register of Historic Places in Saguache County, Colorado
School buildings completed in 1880
School buildings on the National Register of Historic Places in Colorado
Two-room schoolhouses